Yogurt is a dairy product.

Yogurt may also refer to:

Arts, entertainment, and media
Yogurt (band), former name of American punk band Hickey
 Yogurt, a major character in the film Spaceballs (1987)
 Yogurting, a 2005 video game

Brands and enterprises
 Yogurt Mountain, a frozen yogurt chain
 Yogurtland, a California yogurt franchise

Food
 Yogurt rice, an Indian dish
 Yogurt-kun, a San-X food

Other uses
 Yogurt Revolution, a 1988 rally to overthrow the government of Vojvodina and Kosovo

See also
 Gogurt